École de l'Anse-au-sable is a French-language elementary and secondary school located in Kelowna, British Columbia, Canada.  The name L'Anse-au-sable translates to sandy cove in English.

In 2005, the BC Ministry of Education provided $3.2 million to the Conseil scolaire francophone de la Colombie-Britannique to help offset the costs associated with the purchase of the former Central Okanagan Academy. The move to the larger facilities allowed École de l'Anse-an-sable to accept 100 additional students and expand the school to grade 12.

École de l'Anse au sable provides Apple MacBook for grades 7 and up.

On May 30, 2008, four grade 12 students graduated from the school. They were the first ever students to graduate from the school.

References

External links
 French-language school board for British Columbia
 L'Anse-au-sable, school website

Elementary schools in Kelowna
French-language schools in British Columbia
High schools in Kelowna
Educational institutions in Canada with year of establishment missing